Perdita punctosignata is a species of bee in the family Andrenidae. It is found in Central America and North America.

Subspecies
These three subspecies belong to the species Perdita punctosignata:
 Perdita punctosignata flava Timberlake, 1964
 Perdita punctosignata punctosignata
 Perdita punctosignata sulphurea Timberlake, 1964

References

Further reading

 
 

Andrenidae
Articles created by Qbugbot
Insects described in 1895